"Hostage Crisis" is the twenty-second episode and first season finale of Star Wars: The Clone Wars. It first aired on March 20, 2009 on Cartoon Network.

Plot
Cad Bane and his crew of bounty hunters and droid enforcers arrive at the Senate landing zone, where they meet a host of Senate Commandos, who are not happy with their unauthorized arrival. Aurra Sing snipes three of them from long-range and the rest of the bounty hunters overwhelm the rest of the squad. One of the commando droids fools security, via imitating the voice of the squad's leader, into thinking that the guards had taken down a group of protesters before taking their uniforms.

A few levels above, in Senator Padmé Amidala's office, Anakin Skywalker offers to take her to somewhere in the galaxy for a few weeks where no one will recognize them, but Padmé is too focused on her work. He gives her his lightsaber to show his devotion. However, he has to hide, as C-3PO and Bail Organa are about to enter. Organa informs Padmé that they must meet in the lobby to discuss the Enhanced Privacy Invasion Bill. Suddenly, once everyone is gathered, the bounty hunters surround and take them hostage. Senator Philo attempts to leave only to be shot by Bane. He then communicates with Chancellor Palpatine, demanding Ziro the Hutt's release from captivity, but refuses to do so. Unfortunately, Bane proves his point by locking down the entire building, severing all communication with the outside. He takes everyone's comlinks, but before he can search Padmé, who is holding Anakin's lightsaber in her sleeve, Bane notices Anakin in the upper levels and orders an IG-86 sentinel droid and Shahan Alama to get him.

Anakin eludes his pursuers and hot-wires a terminal to communicate with Palpatine, who advises him to get to the central power core to contact for help. Anakin manages to disconnect and hides before the bounty hunters find him, and then uses a mind trick to convince Alama to check the other two floors. As the hunters split up, Anakin follows the IG-86 sentinel droid and bashes it into submission. Alama comes back down to check and finds the droid's mangled remains. Noticing no lightsaber slashes, he quickly figures out that Anakin isn't armed and reports this to Bane, who sends Sing to assist him.

Anakin locates the power core, but a panicked Robonino shuts the door behind him. Alama and Sing then attack Anakin, and Robonino shocks him into unconsciousness.

Bane then gives Palpatine instructions to give a pardon chip to Orn Free Taa to be transported to the prison where Ziro is being held. 3D then comes in to take the Senator. They arrive at the prison and ship Ziro away.

An unconscious Anakin is dragged into the lobby, where the bounty hunters start to plant bombs that can go off if their laser detectors are triggered. This enables the hunters to leave the Senate unhindered, despite an attempt by Orn Free Taa to have them arrested. Anakin wakes up and Padmé gives him back his lightsaber. He then manages to save everyone by cutting a hole in the floor and dropping everyone one floor down, just before Bane triggers the bombs anyway for the clone troopers' interference.

Cad Bane liberates Ziro from prison, and they escape.

Reception
Hostage Crisis received attention for it being the episode that contained the debut of Cad Bane. The episode was generally well received for its willingness to portray violence, but drew criticism for its inclusion of Ziro the Hutt, due to that character being seen as uninteresting and as an offensive LGBT stereotype. The effectiveness of the episode's portrayal of Anakin Skywalker was disputed among critics.

References

External links
 
 

Star Wars: The Clone Wars (2008 TV series) episodes
2008 American television episodes
Television episodes about crime